Jiří Matějíček (born January 7, 1982) is a Czech professional ice hockey player. He made his Czech Extraliga debut with HC Sparta Praha during the 2010–11 Czech Extraliga postseason.

References

External links

1982 births
Czech ice hockey defencemen
HC Sparta Praha players
Living people
Hokej Šumperk 2003 players
HC Vlci Jablonec nad Nisou players
HC Prešov players
Czech expatriate ice hockey players in Slovakia
Czech expatriate sportspeople in Italy
Czech expatriate sportspeople in France
Expatriate ice hockey players in France
Expatriate ice hockey players in Italy
Sportspeople from Hradec Králové